Alfred Berghausen (born 9 December 1889, date of death unknown) was a German international footballer.

References

1889 births
Year of death missing
Association football defenders
German footballers
Germany international footballers